Anthophylax cyaneus is the species of the Lepturinae subfamily in long-horned beetle family. This beetle is distributed in Canada, and United States.

References

Lepturinae